Malvezzi is an Italian surname. Members of an aristocratic family from Bologna

Members of an aristocratic family from Bologna

Annibale Malvezzi: Condottieri for Venetian armies, circa 1480
Virgilio Malvezzi: (1595–1654) historian and essayist, soldier and diplomat
Giovanni Luigi Malvezzi de’ Medici (1819-1892) politician, patriot, and Italian scholar.

The Malvezzi of Bologna were owners of prominent buildings in Bologna and surroundings, including:
Palazzo Malvezzi-Lupari, Bologna
Palazzo Malvezzi-Medici, Bologna
Palazzo Malvezzi-Campeggi, Bologna
Palazzo Malvezzi-Leoni, Bologna 
Palazzo Malvezzi-Hercolani at Castelguelfo
Teatro Malvezzi, Bologna : Opera house built in 1651, burned down in 1745
Rocca Malvezzi-Campeggi: medieval castle in Dozza

Other
Cristofano Malvezzi (1547 – 1599) born Lucca, active in Florence as organist and composer
Jacopo Malvezzi (died c. 1432): doctor and historiographer of Brescia

See also 

 Malpezzi

Italian-language surnames
Surnames of Italian origin